was a town located in Maniwa District, Okayama Prefecture, Japan.

As of 2003, the town had an estimated population of 11,424 and a density of 152.08 persons per km2. The total area was 75.12 km2.

On March 31, 2005, Kuse, along with the town of Hokubō (from Jōbō District), and towns of Katsuyama, Ochiai and Yubara, and the villages of Chūka, Kawakami, Mikamo and Yatsuka (all from Maniwa District) were merged to create the city of Maniwa.

Geography
Rivers: Asahi River (The big-3 river through Okayama)

Adjoining municipalities
Okayama Prefecture
Katsuyama
Ochiai
Yubara
Tsuyama (Former Kume town)
Kagamino (Former Kagamino town and Tomi village)

Education
Senkyō Elementary School
Meki Elementary School
Kashimura Elementary School
Kusakabe Elementary School
Yono Elementary School
Kuse Junior High School
Okayama Prefectural Kuse High School

Transportation

Railways
West Japan Railway Company
Kishin Line
Kuse Station

Road
Expressways:
Yonago Expressway
Kuse Interchange - Ueno Parking Area
National highways:
Route 181
Route 313
Prefectural roads:
Okayama Prefectural Route 65 (Kuse-Chūka)
Okayama Prefectural Route 82 (Kagamino-Kuse)
Okayama Prefectural Route 326 (Kashinishi-Yubara)
Okayama Prefectural Route 327 (Tomihigashidani-Kuse)
Okayama Prefectural Route 329 (Nishibara-Kuse)
Okayama Prefectural Route 330 (Meki-Ōba)

Notable places and events
Former Senkyō Elementary School Building (Important Cultural Properties)
Kuse Festival (October 25–26)

External links
Official website of Maniwa in Japanese

Dissolved municipalities of Okayama Prefecture
Maniwa